Scarborough and Whitby is a constituency represented in the House of Commons of the UK Parliament since 2005 by Robert Goodwill, a Conservative.

History
The constituency name has had two separate periods of existence. 
1918–1974
A Scarborough and Whitby division of the North Riding of Yorkshire was created by the Representation of the People Act 1918 after the Boundary Commission of 1917 and first elected a Member of Parliament in the 1918 general election. This division took the entirety of the abolished Parliamentary borough of Scarborough together with the majority of the previous Whitby division and a very small part of Cleveland division. It had a population, in the middle of 1914, of 72,979. The Boundary Commission had initially recommended that the division simply be called 'Scarborough' but an amendment moved by the Government during enactment of their recommendations enacted it from the outset as Scarborough and Whitby.  Throughout its 56-year first creation which allowed a full franchise for all resident men it was represented by a Conservative, including during the Attlee Ministry and First Wilson Ministry.

Changes to boundaries
The Initial Report of the Boundary Commission in 1947 made minor changes to the constituency, in line with local government changes which had abolished Guisborough Rural District in 1932 and absorbed it into Whitby Rural District. The new constituency again included the whole of Whitby Rural District, and so gained Hinderwell which was previously within Cleveland constituency. It had an electorate of 67,884 on 15 October 1946. No change was made in the First Periodical Report of the Boundary Commission in 1954.

The Second Periodical Report, published in 1969 recommended that the constituency be divided and its recommendations came into effect at the February 1974 general election abolishing the seat. The Scarborough constituency was thereby re-established, and Whitby joined with Guisborough, Loftus, Saltburn and Brotton to form Cleveland and Whitby.

By the beginning of the Third Periodical Report of the Boundary Commission, Cleveland had been created as a new county, which would normally prevent the commission from recommending a constituency crossing the border. Several representations were made to the commission to try to preserve Cleveland and Whitby constituency, but the Commission found itself unable to accept them and recommended putting Scarborough and Whitby together in a new Scarborough despite including the other coastal town, its old name, including Whitby, was finally reinstated in the next review. This constituency did not include Pickering, which was placed in a new Ryedale constituency.

1997-date
In the Fourth Periodical Report of the Boundary Commission for England, published in 1995 and coming into effect at the 1997 general election, the Scarborough constituency was renamed as Scarborough and Whitby with no change in boundaries.

When the constituency was recreated in 1997, the Labour candidate, Lawrie Quinn, defeated John Sykes, the sitting Conservative MP – one of many locally and national press-predicted unlikely gains for Labour in their landslide victory of that year. The current incumbent, Robert Goodwill, defeated Quinn in 2005 to regain the seat for Conservatives.

Prominent members

Sir Herbert Paul Latham was the first sitting Member of Parliament serving in the army to have been court martialled since 1815.

Sir Alexander Spearman served as the Parliamentary Private Secretary to the President of the Board of Trade from 1951 to 1952.

Sir Robert Goodwill served in as a junior minister in both the Cameron–Clegg coalition and the second Cameron ministry.

Boundaries

1918–1950: The Municipal Borough of Scarborough, the Urban Districts of Pickering, Scalby, and Whitby, the Rural Districts of Scarborough and Whitby, and parts of the Rural District of Pickering and Guisborough.

1950–1974: The Municipal Borough of Scarborough, the Urban Districts of Pickering, Scalby, and Whitby, and the Rural Districts of Scarborough and Whitby.

1997–2010: The Borough of Scarborough wards of Ayton, Castle, Cayton, Central, Danby, Derwent, Eastfield, Eskdaleside, Falsgrave, Fylingdales, Lindhead, Mayfield, Mulgrave, Newby, Northstead, Scalby, Seamer, Streonshalh, Weaponness, and Woodlands.

2010–present: The Borough of Scarborough wards of Castle, Cayton, Central, Danby, Derwent Valley, Eastfield, Esk Valley, Falsgrave Park, Fylingdales, Lindhead, Mayfield, Mulgrave, Newby, North Bay, Northstead, Ramshill, Scalby Hackness and Staintondale, Seamer, Stepney, Streonshalh, Weaponness, Whitby West Cliff, and Woodlands.

Constituency profile
The constituency covers the towns of Scarborough and Whitby. Both of these are seaside towns in North Yorkshire on the north-east coast of England. However, the constituency is largely rural and semi-rural, such issues tend to influence voting preferences, with Scarborough itself mostly Labour and the rural areas Conservative. At the last two general elections, it was the most marginal seat in North Yorkshire.

In statistics
The constituency consists of Census Output Areas of a Borough with a working population whose income is close to the national average and lower than average reliance upon social housing.  At the end of 2012 the unemployment rate in the constituency stood as 4.8% of the population claiming jobseekers allowance, compared to the regional average of 4.7%. The borough has a medium-high 28.8% of its population without a car, a high 26.0% of the population without qualifications and a medium 22.7% with level 4 qualifications or above.

In terms of tenure, a high 75.8% of homes are owned outright or on a mortgage as at the 2011 UK Census across the borough.

Members of Parliament

MPs 1918–1974

MPs since 1997

Elections

Elections in the 2010s

Elections in the 2000s

Elections in the 1990s

Election in the 1970s

Elections in the 1960s

Elections in the 1950s

Elections in the 1940s 

General Election 1939–40:

Another general election was required to take place before the end of 1940. The political parties had been making preparations for an election to take place from 1939 and by the end of this year, the following candidates had been selected; 
Conservative: Alexander Spearman
Liberal: Margery Corbett-Ashby

Elections in the 1930s

Elections in the 1920s

Elections in the 1910s

See also
List of parliamentary constituencies in North Yorkshire
Wayback Machine www.annajoydavid.org.uk

Notes

References
Specific

General
Craig, F. W. S. (1983). British parliamentary election results 1918-1949 (3 ed.). Chichester: Parliamentary Research Services. .

Sources 
 

Parliamentary constituencies in Yorkshire and the Humber
Constituencies of the Parliament of the United Kingdom established in 1918
Constituencies of the Parliament of the United Kingdom disestablished in 1974
Constituencies of the Parliament of the United Kingdom established in 1997
Politics of the Borough of Scarborough
Whitby